Marina Shults (born  in Chelyabinsk) is an Israeli group rhythmic gymnast. She represents her nation at international competitions.

She participated at the 2012 Summer Olympics in London.
She also competed at world championships, including at the 2010 and 2011 World Rhythmic Gymnastics Championships.

References

External links
 
 Israelis Finish Last in Rhythmic Gymnastics Olympic Final, Despite Near-faultless Show by Haaretz
 Israel’s rhythmic gymnastics team heads to Olympic finals at jta.org

1994 births
Living people
Israeli rhythmic gymnasts
Place of birth missing (living people)
Gymnasts at the 2012 Summer Olympics
Olympic gymnasts of Israel
Medalists at the Rhythmic Gymnastics World Championships
Israeli people of Russian-Jewish descent